Ronald McDonald is a clown character used as the primary mascot of the McDonald's fast-food restaurant chain. He inhabits the fictional world of McDonaldland, with his friends Mayor McCheese, the Hamburglar, Grimace, Birdie the Early Bird and The Fry Kids.

Many people work full-time making appearances as Ronald, visiting children in hospitals and attending regular events. At its height, there may have been as many as 300 full-time clowns at McDonald's restaurants. There are also Ronald McDonald Houses, where parents can stay overnight with their sick children in nearby chronic care facilities.

History

Washington, DC
"Ronald McDonald, the Hamburger-Happy Clown" originally appeared in 1963 on three separate local television spots. The advertisements were created by the advertising agency of Oscar Goldstein, who doubled as a McDonald's franchisee in the Washington, D.C., area. The first person to portray Ronald was Willard Scott, who had played Bozo the Clown on WRC-TV in Washington from 1959 to 1962 and was an employee of Goldstein at the time.

Scott, who went on to become NBC-TV's Today Show weatherman, recounted the creation of the character in his book Joy of Living:

McDonald's does not specify a creator of the character in its official statement of the character's history:

On March 28, 2000, Henry Gonzalez, McDonald's Northeast Division President, thanked Scott for creating Ronald McDonald during a taped tribute to Scott on the Today Show.

Nationwide rollout
The character first appeared in national TV advertising in 1965, during the Macy's Thanksgiving Day Parade, and followed with spots during the 1965 NFL Championship Game.

Circus performer Coco the Clown (real name Michael Polakovs) was hired in 1966 to revamp Ronald's image, creating the now familiar costume and make-up.

In 2010, the Corporate Accountability International in Boston, Massachusetts, suggested Ronald McDonald should retire due to childhood obesity. However, McDonald's CEO Jim Skinner said there are no plans to retire him.

In April 2011, McDonald's announced that Ronald McDonald will reappear in their commercials, but Ace Metrix stated Ronald McDonald ads are no longer effective. On May 18, 2011, Corporate Accountability International renewed their call to retire Ronald McDonald by running ads in major newspapers and launching several web pages dedicated to the retirement of the character. However, McDonald's CEO Jim Skinner defended Ronald McDonald by saying that he is an ambassador for good and "it's all about choice". Shortly after, McDonald's announced that Ronald McDonald was "here to stay".

In April 2014, McDonald's announced that Ronald McDonald would have a whole new look and new outfits. They also announced that he would be featured in their new commercials as well as on social media websites like Twitter. As part of Ronald's makeover, his jumpsuit has been dropped in favor of yellow cargo pants, a vest and a red-and-white striped rugby shirt; his classic clown shoes remain part of the official uniform.

Actors 
At any given time, there are dozens to hundreds of actors retained by McDonald's to appear as Ronald McDonald in restaurants and events. It is assumed, however, that the company uses only one actor at a time to play the character in national television commercials. Following is a list of primary American Ronald McDonald actors.
 Willard Scott (Washington, D.C. 1963–1965)
 Bev Bergeron (Southern California, 1966–1968)
 George Voorhis (Southern California, 1968–1970)
 Michael Polakovs (1965–1968)
 Ray Rayner (1968–1969)
 Viv Weekes (1968–1970) (local)
 Bob Brandon (1970–1975) (local)
 King Moody (1969–1985)
 Squire Fridell (1985–1991)
 Jack Doepke (1991–1999)
 David Hussey (2000–2014)
 Brad Lennon (2014–present)

Various forms of the name "Ronald McDonald" as well as costume clown face persona, etc. are registered trademarks of McDonald's. McDonald's trains performers to portray Ronald using identical mannerisms and costume, to contribute to the illusion that they are one character. McDonald's marketing designers and stylists changed elements of the Ronald McDonald character, persona, style, costume and clown face when they adopted the clown as a trademark.

Joe Maggard claim
An actor named Joe Maggard claimed to have performed as Ronald McDonald from 1995 to 2007, though these dates overlap with the portrayals by Jack Doepke and David Hussey. In a 2003 article by The Baltimore Sun, a spokesperson for McDonald's said that Mr. Maggard was simply a stand-in for Ronald for one commercial shoot in the mid-1990s, and stated that "he is definitely not Ronald McDonald."

International localization
In Thailand, Ronald McDonald greets people in the traditional Thai wai greeting gesture of both hands pressed together. The Thai version of the company mascot was created in 2002 by the local Thai franchise, McThai, as part of a "McThai in the Thai Spirit" campaign. The figure has also been exported to India and other countries where a similar gesture is used. In China, out of respect for Ronald McDonald as an adult, children refer to him as "Uncle McDonald". In Japan, Ronald McDonald is called  due to a lack of a clear "r" sound in Japanese enunciation.

Licensed works

Books
Charlton Comics obtained the license to publish four issues of a Ronald comic sold on newsstands in 1970–1971. Over the years several giveaway comics have also been produced starring the character.

Ronald (with Grimace) appeared in the 1984 Little Golden Book Ronald McDonald and the Tale of the Talking Plant, which was written by John Albano and illustrated by John Costanza.

In 1991, Ronald appears in the Discover the Rainforest activity book series consisting of Paint It Wild: Paint & See Activity Book, Sticker Safari: Sticker and Activity Book, Wonders in the Wild: Activity Book, and Ronald McDonald and the Jewel of the Amazon Kingdom: Storybook, which are written by Mike Roberts and Russell Mittermeier, Gad Meiron, and Randall Stone, and illustrated by Donna Reynolds and Tim Racer, in which he is seen here as a nature show host and tour guide.

Animation

In 1987, Ronald McDonald (with Birdie, Hamburglar, Grimace and the Professor) appeared in an eight-minute animated short film titled Ronald McDonald and the Adventure Machine, which was only shown during birthday parties at McDonald's restaurants.

In 1990, a 40-minute animated direct-to-video film titled The Adventures of Ronald McDonald: McTreasure Island and produced by DIC Entertainment was released on VHS by Hi-Tops Video.

From 1998 until 2003 a series of direct-to-video animated episodes titled The Wacky Adventures of Ronald McDonald and produced by Klasky Csupo were released in participating McDonald's worldwide on VHS.

Video games
Ronald McDonald is the protagonist of three video games: Donald Land, developed by Data East for the Famicom console, released only in Japan in 1988; McDonald's Treasure Land Adventure, developed by Treasure for the Mega Drive console and released in 1993; and Ronald McDonald in Magical World, developed by SIMS for the Game Gear handheld, released only in Japan in 1994.

He is also featured in two more video games: M.C. Kids for NES, Game Boy, C64, Amiga, Atari ST, and MS-DOS; and Global Gladiators for Genesis, Master System, Game Gear and Amiga.

Film
Ronald McDonald appears for a few seconds in the 1988 film Mac and Me during a birthday scene set at a McDonald's. He is played by Squire Fridell, but is credited as "Ronald McDonald as himself". He won a Golden Raspberry Award for Worst New Star for his appearance in the film. The character also prominently appears in the theatrical trailer for the film.

Subversion
Ronald McDonald's prominence has made him a symbol for McDonald's as well as Corporate America, capitalism and globalization. His costume and iconography are often appropriated by protestors and artists wishing to subvert the icon and communicate an anti-corporate message. For example, in 2000, protestors in Hong Kong dressed as Ronald McDonald to protest the labor policies of McDonald's in China.

In 2010, the Oscar-winning animated short Logorama prominently featured a depiction of Ronald McDonald as a criminal on the run from the police.

"He's just fucking gone, dude," remarked Slipknot's Shawn Crahan, aka 'Clown'. "He's out there in his little yellow suit, with his fucked-up red hair, and he's got a hold on entire families. I like how that worked out for him."

Criticism and 2016 appearances
Critics claimed that a clown mascot targeting children for fast food is unethical. A group of 550 doctors and other health professionals took out newspaper ads in 2011, saying that Ronald McDonald should be retired.

Ronald McDonald made fewer appearances since 2016 due to the 2016 clown sightings. However, he continues to appear at live events, and on social media.

References

Further reading
 Schlosser, E. (2006) Chew on this: everything you don't want to know about fast food. Boston, MA: Houghton Mifflin Co.

External links
^

American clowns
Corporate mascots
McDonald's characters
McDonald's advertising
Fast food advertising characters
Fictional clowns
Male characters in advertising
Mascots introduced in 1963
Internet memes